Keratin 18 is a type I cytokeratin. It is, together with its filament partner keratin 8, perhaps the most commonly found products of the intermediate filament gene family. They are expressed in single layer epithelial tissues of the body. Mutations in this gene have been linked to cryptogenic cirrhosis. Two transcript variants encoding the same protein have been found for this gene.

Keratin 18 is often used together with keratin 8 and keratin 19 to differentiate cells of epithelial origin from hematopoietic cells in tests that enumerate circulating tumor cells in blood.

Interactions
Keratin 18 has been shown to interact with Collagen, type XVII, alpha 1, DNAJB6, Pinin and TRADD.

References

Further reading

Keratins